John Holden Gibson II (born February 15, 1959) is an American businessman and government official. Gibson is the former Chief Management Officer of the United States Department of Defense. Prior to serving as CMO, Gibson served as the Deputy Chief Management Officer for the Defense Department from November 2017 to February 2018. He has been chief financial officer, chief operating officer, and managing director for several companies including a national consulting group. Gibson previously served as Deputy Under Secretary of Defense for Management Reform and as Assistant Secretary of the Air Force (Financial Management & Comptroller).

Education
Gibson attended the University of Texas at Austin, graduating in 1981. He received two undergraduate degrees, a Bachelor of Business Administration with a specialty in finance and a Bachelor of Arts in economics. In 1994, Gibson earned a Master of Business Administration from the University of Dallas.

Business career
Gibson began his executive career with Westgate Fabrics, Inc. He served as chief financial officer, chief operating officer, and executive vice president. In these positions Gibson was responsible for company finances, operational performance, and strategic planning.  Gibson then moved to Galbraith Electric Company where he went through the same job progression of chief financial officer to chief operating officer to vice president. As vice president, Gibson led the company through a business merger.  After the merger, he remained with the new company, assisting with business operations and acquisition strategy.  Prior to entering public service, Gibson was managing director of the DK Consulting Group of Abilene, Texas, where he helped large corporations plan business acquisitions and mergers. As a consultant, he specialized in banking, construction, distribution, retail sales, and health care acquisitions and mergers. Gibson was also a member of the Abilene Chamber of Commerce’s Military Affairs Committee from 1998 until 2006.

Gibson was CEO of XCOR Aerospace from 2015 to June 2017.

Public service

In February 2006, President George W. Bush appointed Gibson to the position of Deputy Under Secretary of Defense for Management Reform. In this role, he was responsible for promoting management efficiency and streamlining financial operations within the Department of Defense. To accomplish this, he worked closely with the Department of Defense Inspector General, the Government Accountability Office, the Office of Management and Budget, and the United States Congress.  Gibson also served as acting Deputy Under Secretary of Defense for Financial Management from July 2006 through July 2007.

On October 24, 2007, President Bush nominated Gibson to be Assistant Secretary of the Air Force for Financial Management and Comptroller.  The United States Senate confirmed his nomination on December 20, 2007.  On January 15, 2008, Gibson was sworn in as the 20th Assistant Secretary of the Air Force for Financial Management and Comptroller by Secretary of the Air Force Michael W. Wynne.  During his tenure as the Air Force's chief financial officer, Gibson was responsible for managing an annual operating budget of $124 billion.  He supported professional training and education programs to help financial managers produce better cost estimates, budget projections and financial analysis for decision makers throughout the Air Force.  Gibson also expanded the Air Force Financial Services Center, opening a customer call center to provide financial services to 700,000 Airmen and civilian employees around the world.

In June 2017, President Donald Trump nominated Gibson to be Deputy Chief Management Officer for the Department of Defense.  His nomination was confirmed by a 91 to 7 vote in the United States Senate on November 7, 2017. Gibson was responsible for overseeing the integration and coordination of business operations within the Department of Defense. In January 2018, he was nominated for promotion to the newly created office of Chief Management Officer of the Department of Defense. This nomination was confirmed by voice vote of the Senate on February 15, 2018.  On November 5, 2018, Gibson submitted his resignation from the office of Chief Management Officer of the Department of Defense effective November 30.

Professional associations
Gibson is a member of the Air Force Association and the American Society of Military Comptrollers. In addition, he actively supports the Association of Government Accountants.

References

External links

|-

|-

1959 births
American chief financial officers
American chief operating officers
George W. Bush administration personnel
Living people
People from Abilene, Texas
People from Flushing, Queens
Texas Republicans
Trump administration personnel
United States Department of Defense officials
University of Dallas alumni
McCombs School of Business alumni